Frederick Taylor McKenzie (13 November 1903 – 1979) was a Scottish professional footballer who made nearly 300 appearances in the English Football League playing for Newport County and Plymouth Argyle. He played as a centre half.

McKenzie was born in Lochee, Dundee. He played for Scottish Junior club Lochee United before coming to England in 1924 to play for Newport County. In 1926 he joined Plymouth Argyle. He made 214 appearances for the club in all competitions over eight seasons, the last of which came in April 1934, after which he played for one more season for Newport County.

References

1903 births
1979 deaths
Association football central defenders
Date of death missing
Lochee United F.C. players
Newport County A.F.C. players
Place of death missing
Plymouth Argyle F.C. players
Scottish footballers
Scottish Junior Football Association players
Footballers from Dundee
English Football League players
People from Lochee